Statistics of Emperor's Cup in the 1999 season.

Overview
It was contested by 80 teams, and Nagoya Grampus Eight won the championship.

Results

1st round
Juntendo University 2–0 Aichi Gakuin University
Tochigi SC 0–2 Júbilo Iwata Youth
Kusatsu Higashi High School 0–2 Tokyo
Hatsushiba Hashimoto High School 2–1 Hachinohe University
Nippon Bunri University 1–2 Sagan Tosu
Nagoya SC 3–4 Jatco SC
Maebashi Comercial High School 1–2 Ventforet Kofu
Sony Sendai 2–1 Iwate University
Maruoka High School 1–11 Otsuka Pharmaceuticals
Yamaguchi Teachers 2–3 Fukuoka University
Blaze Kumamoto 0–8 Montedio Yamagata
Okinawa International University 0–2 Teihens FC
FC Primeiro 0–2 Albirex Niigata
National Institute of Fitness and Sports in Kanoya 1–0 Konan University
Nara Sangyo University 2–7 Denso
Iwami FC 7–3 Tokushima Commercial High School
Kunimi High School 0–4 Kokushikan University
Senshu University 1–0 Yamagata FC
Hiroshima University 0–6 Oita Trinita
Kakamihara High School 2–8 ALO's Hokuriku
Hannan University 1–2 Consadole Sapporo
Mind House Yokkaichi 2–1 Mitsubishi Motors Mizushima
Nankoku Kochi FC 3–7 Honda
Kagawa Shiun Club 4–3 Nissei Industries FC
Honda Lock 0–5 Vegalta Sendai
Mito HollyHock 5–1 TDK
Ibaraki Sakai High School 0–6 Omiya Ardija
Nirasaki Astros 4–4 (PK 2–4) Doto University
Ehime FC 0–3 Kawasaki Frontale
Josai University 4–1 Kyushu INAX
Ritsumeikan University 2–1 Tsukuba University
Yokohama FC 8–0 Niigata University

2nd round
Juntendo University 3–0 Júbilo Iwata Youth
FC Tokyo 6–0 Hatsushiba Hashimoto High School
Sagan Tosu 2–1 Jatco SC
Ventforet Kofu 0–0 (PK 3–4) Sony Sendai
Otsuka Pharmaceuticals 0–2 Fukuoka University
Montedio Yamagata 3–0 Teihens FC
Albirex Niigata 1–0 NIFS Kanoya
Denso 7–0 Iwami FC
Kokushikan University 1–2 Senshu University
Oita Trinita 10–0 ALO's Hokuriku
Consadole Sapporo 3–0 Mind House Yokkaichi
Honda FC 6–0 Kagawa Shiun Club
Vegalta Sendai 1–2 Mito HollyHock
Omiya Ardija 3–0 Doto University
Kawasaki Frontale 5–1 Josai University
Ritsumeikan University 1–4 Yokohama FC

3rd round
Bellmare Hiratsuka          3–4 FC Tokyo (aet)
Kashima Antlers             1–0 Sagan Tosu
Nagoya Grampus Eight        4–0 Sony Sendai
Cerezo Osaka                4–1 Fukuoka University                            
Vissel Kobe                 0–0 Montedio Yamagata  (aet, 3-4 pen)
Urawa Red Diamonds          3–1 Albirex Niigata
Kashiwa Reysol              4–2 Denso                                        
Kyoto Purple Sanga          1–0 Oita Trinita                                  
Avispa Fukuoka              1–0 Consadole Sapporo                            
Sanfrecce Hiroshima         3–2 Honda FC                                         
Yokohama F. Marinos         2–1 Mito HollyHock                              
Gamba Osaka                 1–0 Omiya Ardija                                 
JEF United Ichihara         2–3 Kawasaki Frontale                             
Verdy Kawasaki              3–2 Yokohama FC    (aet)         
Jubilo Iwata                2–0 Juntendo University                          
Shimizu S-Pulse             2–1 Senshu University

4th round
Júbilo Iwata 3–0 Tokyo
Kashima Antlers 1–2 Nagoya Grampus Eight
Cerezo Osaka 3–4 Montedio Yamagata
Urawa Red Diamonds 0–2 Kashiwa Reysol
Shimizu S-Pulse 2–2 (PK 4–2) Kyoto Purple Sanga
Avispa Fukuoka 1–2 Sanfrecce Hiroshima
Yokohama F. Marinos 2–1 Gamba Osaka
Kawasaki Frontale 1–3 Verdy Kawasaki

Quarterfinals
Júbilo Iwata 0–1 Nagoya Grampus Eight
Montedio Yamagata 0–2 Kashiwa Reysol
Shimizu S-Pulse 0–2 Sanfrecce Hiroshima
Yokohama F. Marinos 0–1 Verdy Kawasaki

Semifinals
Nagoya Grampus Eight 2–0 Kashiwa Reysol
Sanfrecce Hiroshima 7–2 Verdy Kawasaki

Final

Nagoya Grampus Eight 2–0 Sanfrecce Hiroshima
Nagoya Grampus Eight won the championship.

References
 NHK

Emperor's Cup
Emp
2000 in Japanese football